Defending champions Robin Ammerlaan and Michaël Jérémiasz defeated Shingo Kunieda and Tadeusz Kruszelnicki in the final, 7–6(7–2), 6–1 to win the men's doubles wheelchair tennis title at the 2006 US Open.

Seeds
  Robin Ammerlaan /  Michaël Jeremiasz
  Shingo Kunieda /  Tadeusz Kruszelnicki

Draw

Finals

References 
 Draw

Men's Wheelchair Doubles
U.S. Open, 2006 Men's Doubles